Eric Exequiel Meza (born 8 April 1999) is an Argentine professional footballer who plays as a right-back for Colón.

Career
Meza, following a spell with city rivals Unión Santa Fe, joined Colón's ranks in 2009. After eleven years in their academy, manager Eduardo Domínguez moved him into the first-team squad in 2020. He initially made the substitute's bench for Copa de la Liga Profesional group stage matches with Defensa y Justicia (x2), Independiente and Central Córdoba in November. Meza's senior debut arrived in that competition on 28 November in a home defeat to Independiente, as he replaced Gonzalo Piovi after seventy-seven minutes at the Estadio Brigadier General Estanislao López.

Career statistics
.

Notes

References

External links

1999 births
Living people
Place of birth missing (living people)
Argentine footballers
Association football defenders
Argentine Primera División players
Club Atlético Colón footballers